Zbąszynek railway station is a railway station serving the town of Zbąszynek, in the Lubusz Voivodeship, Poland. The station opened in 1925 and is located on the Warsaw–Kunowice railway, Zbąszynek–Guben railway and Zbąszynek-Gorzów Wielkopolski railway. The train services are operated by PKP, Przewozy Regionalne and Koleje Wielkopolskie.

The station was opened as a border station between Germany and Poland, with Zbąszyń railway station becoming the Polish border station. Between 1922 and 1930 the station was known as Neubentschen and from 1931 until 1945 the station was known as Neu Bentschen.

Train services
The station is served by the following service(s):

EuroCity services (EC) (EC 95 by DB) (EIC by PKP) Berlin - Frankfurt (Oder) - Rzepin - Poznan - Kutno - Warsaw
EuroCity services (EC) (EC 95 by DB) (IC by PKP) Berlin - Frankfurt (Oder) - Rzepin - Poznan - Bydgoszcz - Gdansk - Gdynia
EuroNight services (EN) Cologne - Duisburg - Dortmund - Berlin - Frankfurt (Oder) - Poznan - Kutno - Warsaw
Intercity services Zielona Gora - Zbaszynek - Poznan - Kutno - Warsaw
Intercity services Zielona Góra - Zbąszynek - Poznan - Inowroclaw - Bydgoszcz - Gdansk - Gdynia
Intercity services Zielona Góra - Zbąszynek - Poznan - Inowroclaw - Torun - Olsztyn
Regional services (R) Rzepin - Swiebodzin - Zbasynek
Regional services (R) (Nowa Sol -) Zielona Gora - Zbaszynek - Zbąszyn - Opalenica - Poznan
Regional services (R) Zielona Gora - Zbaszynek - Miedzyrzecz - Gorzow Wielkopolskie
Regional services (KW) Zbaszynek - Zbąszyn - Opalenica - Poznan
Regional services (KW) Zbaszynek - Zbaszyn - Wolsztyn - Boszkowo - Leszno

References 

 This article is based upon a translation of the Polish language version as of July 2016.

External links 

Railway stations in Lubusz Voivodeship
Człuchów County
Railway stations in Poland opened in 1925